Daily Republican may refer to:

The Republican (Springfield, Massachusetts)
The Daily Republican, newspaper in Marion, Ohio
Daily Republican (Arkansas), a Reconstruction era newspaper published in Little Rock
Daily Republican, a newspaper published in Monongahela, Pennsylvania
Belvidere Daily Republican published in Belvidere, Illinois
Mitchell Daily Republican published in Mitchell, South Dakota
Winona Daily Republican in Winona, Minnesota

Disambiguation pages